1109 Tata, provisional designation , is a dark Hygiean asteroid from the outer regions of the asteroid belt, approximately  in diameter. It was discovered on 5 February 1929, by German astronomer Karl Reinmuth at the Heidelberg-Königstuhl State Observatory in Germany. The meaning of the asteroids's name is unknown.

Orbit and classification 

Tata is a member of the Hygiea family, a very large family of carbonaceous outer-belt asteroids. The family's parent body and namesake is the main belt's fourth-largest asteroid, 10 Hygiea. It orbits the Sun in the outer asteroid belt at a distance of 2.9–3.5 AU once every 5 years and 10 months (2,117 days; semi-major axis of 3.23 AU). Its orbit has an eccentricity of 0.10 and an inclination of 4° with respect to the ecliptic.

The body's observation arc begins at Heidelberg in March 1929, one month after its official discovery observation.

Physical characteristics 

In the Tholen classification, Tata has an ambiguous spectral type, closest to the rare F-types and somewhat similar to the common carbonaceous C-type asteroids. It has also been characterized as a primitive P-type asteroid by the space-based Wide-field Infrared Survey Explorer (WISE).

Rotation period 

In July 2005, a rotational lightcurve of Tata was obtained from photometric observations by French amateur astronomer Laurent Bernasconi. Lightcurve analysis gave a rotation period of 8.277 hours with a low brightness amplitude of 0.06 magnitude, indicative for a spherical shape. The astronomer also reported that several other period solution could be possible.

Diameter and albedo 

According to the surveys carried out by the Infrared Astronomical Satellite IRAS, the Japanese Akari satellite and the NEOWISE mission of NASA's WISE telescope, Tata measures between 61.817 and 74.94 kilometers in diameter and its surface has an albedo between 0.0378 and 0.0485.

The Collaborative Asteroid Lightcurve Link adopts the results obtained by IRAS, that is, an albedo of 0.0378 and a diameter of 66.53 kilometers based on an absolute magnitude of 10.06.

Naming 

Any reference of this minor planet's name to a person or occurrence is unknown.

Unknown meaning 

Among the many thousands of named minor planets, Tata is one of 120 asteroids, for which no official naming citation has been published.

References

External links 
 Asteroid Lightcurve Database (LCDB), query form (info )
 Dictionary of Minor Planet Names, Google books
 Asteroids and comets rotation curves, CdR – Observatoire de Genève, Raoul Behrend
 Discovery Circumstances: Numbered Minor Planets (1)-(5000) – Minor Planet Center
 
 

001109
Discoveries by Karl Wilhelm Reinmuth
Named minor planets
001109
19290205